The Coastal Bend Council of Governments (CBCOG) is a voluntary association of cities, counties and special districts in South Texas.

Based in Corpus Christi, the Coastal Bend Council of Governments is a member of the Texas Association of Regional Councils.

Counties served
Aransas
Bee
Brooks
Duval
Jim Wells
Kenedy
Kleberg
Live Oak
Nueces
Refugio
San Patricio

Former Counties served
McMullen (1966-2013; now part of AACOG)

Largest cities in the region
Corpus Christi
Kingsville
Alice
Portland
Beeville
Robstown
Ingleside
Mathis
Sinton
Falfurrias

References

External links
Coastal Bend Council of Governments - Official site.

Texas Association of Regional Councils